Tony Figueira may refer to:

 Tony Figueira (footballer) (born 1981), Portuguese football player
 Tony Figueira (photographer), Namibian photographer